|}

The Abernant Stakes is a Group 3 flat horse race in Great Britain open to horses aged three years or older. It is run over a distance of 6 furlongs (1,207 metres) on the Rowley Mile at Newmarket in mid-April.

History
The event is named after Abernant, a successful sprinter in the late 1940s and early 1950s. It was established in 1969, and the first running was won by Song.

For a period the race held Listed status. It was promoted to Group 3 level in 2013.

The race is currently staged on the second day of Newmarket's three-day Craven Meeting. It is run on the same day as the Craven Stakes.

The leading horses from the Abernant Stakes sometimes go on to compete in the Palace House Stakes or the Duke of York Stakes.

Records

Most successful horse (4 wins):
 Boldboy – 1974, 1976, 1977, 1978

Leading jockey (4 wins):
 Joe Mercer – Song (1969), Shiny Tenth (1972), Boldboy (1974, 1976)

Leading trainer (4 wins):
 Dick Hern – Boldboy (1974, 1976, 1977, 1978)
 Kevin Ryan – Hamza (2014), Astaire (2015), Brando (2017, 2018)

Winners

See also
 Horse racing in Great Britain
 List of British flat horse races

References

 Paris-Turf:
 Racing Post:

 galopp-sieger.de – Abernant Stakes.
 ifhaonline.org – International Federation of Horseracing Authorities – Abernant Stakes (2019).
 pedigreequery.com – Abernant Stakes – Newmarket.

Open sprint category horse races
Newmarket Racecourse
Flat races in Great Britain
1969 establishments in England
Recurring sporting events established in 1969